Cleidocranial dysostosis (CCD), also called cleidocranial dysplasia, is a birth defect that mostly affects the bones and teeth. The collarbones are typically either poorly developed or absent, which allows the shoulders to be brought close together. The front of the skull often does not close until later, and those affected are often shorter than average. Other symptoms may include a prominent forehead, wide set eyes, abnormal teeth, and a flat nose. Symptoms vary among people; however, intelligence is typically unaffected.

The condition is either inherited or occurs as a new mutation. It is inherited in an autosomal dominant manner. It is due to a defect in the RUNX2 gene which is involved in bone formation. Diagnosis is suspected based on symptoms and X-rays with confirmation by genetic testing. Other conditions that can produce similar symptoms include mandibuloacral dysplasia, pyknodysostosis, osteogenesis imperfecta, and Hajdu-Cheney syndrome.

Treatment includes supportive measures such as a device to protect the skull and dental care. Surgery may be performed to fix certain bone abnormalities. Life expectancy is generally normal.

It affects about one per million people. Males and females are equally commonly affected. Modern descriptions of the condition date to at least 1896. The term is from cleido meaning collarbone, cranial from the Greek κρανιὀς meaning skull, and dysostosis meaning formation of abnormal bone.

Signs and symptoms
Cleidocranial dysostosis is a general skeletal condition so named from the collarbone (cleido-) and cranium deformities which people with it often have.

People with the condition usually present with a painless swelling in the area of the clavicles at 2–3 years of age. Common features are:
 Clavicles (collarbones) can be partly missing leaving only the medial part of the bone. In 10% of cases, they are completely missing. If the collarbones are completely missing or reduced to small vestiges, this allows hypermobility of the shoulders including ability to touch the shoulders together in front of the chest. The defect is bilateral 80% of the time. Partial collarbones may cause nerve damage symptoms and therefore have to be removed by surgery.
 The mandible is prognathic due to hypoplasia of maxilla (micrognathism) and other facial bones.
 A soft spot or larger soft area in the top of the head where the fontanelle failed to close, or the fontanelle closes late.
 Bones and joints are underdeveloped. People are shorter and their frames are smaller than their siblings who do not have the condition.
 The permanent teeth include supernumerary teeth. Unless these supernumeraries are removed they will crowd the adult teeth in what already may be an underdeveloped jaw. If so, the supernumeraries will probably need to be removed to make space for the adult teeth. Up to 13 supernumerary teeth have been observed. Teeth may also be displaced. Cementum formation may be deficient.
 Failure of eruption of permanent teeth.
 Bossing (bulging) of the forehead.
 Open skull sutures, large fontanelles.
 Hypertelorism.
 Delayed ossification of bones forming symphysis pubis, producing a widened symphysis.
 Coxa vara can occur, limiting abduction and causing Trendelenburg gait.
 Short middle fifth phalanges, sometimes causing short and wide fingers.
 Vertebral abnormalities.
 On rare occasions, brachial plexus irritation can occur.
 Scoliosis, spina bifida and syringomyelia have also been described.
Wide nasal bridge
Crooked teeth
Increased risk of flat foot and knee deformities
High risk of hearing loss caused by infections
Decreased bone density, resulting in increased risk of fractures
Other features are: parietal  bossing, basilar invagination (atlantoaxial impaction), persistent metopic suture, abnormal  ear structures with hearing loss, supernumerary ribs, hemivertebrae with spondylosis,  small and high scapulae, hypoplasia of illiac bones, absence of the pubic bone, short / absent fibular bones, short / absent  radial bones, hypoplastic terminal phalanges.

Genetics
CCD is usually autosomal dominant, but in some cases its cause is not known.  The main mechanism is thought to involve haploinsufficiency caused by mutations in CBFA1 (also known as Runx2), a gene located on the short arm of chromosome 6 (6p21), which encodes a transcription factor required for the differentiation of stem cells into osteoblasts. This results in delayed ossification of midline structures of the body and ensuing defects in membranous and endochondral bone formation.

Diagnosis
Different features of the dysostosis are significant. Radiological imaging helps confirm the diagnosis. During gestation (pregnancy), clavicular size can be calculated using available nomograms. Wormian bones can sometimes be observed in the skull.

Diagnosis of CCD spectrum disorder is established in an individual with typical clinical and radiographic findings and/or by the identification of a heterozygous pathogenic variant in RUNX2 (CBFA1).

Treatment
Around 5 years of age, surgical correction may be necessary to prevent any worsening of the deformity. If the mother has dysplasia, caesarian delivery may be necessary. Craniofacial surgery may be necessary to correct skull defects. Coxa vara is treated by corrective femoral osteotomies. If there is brachial plexus irritation with pain and numbness, excision of the clavicular fragments can be performed to decompress it. In case of open fontanelle, appropriate headgear may be advised by the orthopedist for protection from injury.

Prognosis 
Several studies have reported that life expectancy appears to be normal for people with CCD.

Epidemiology
Cleidocranial dysostosis affects about one per million people.

Notable cases
In 1987, a young girl named Jessica McClure fell down a narrow well pipe in her family's Texas property. Ron Short, a roofing contractor who was born without collarbones because of cleidocranial dysostosis and thus could collapse his shoulders to work in cramped corners, arrived at the site and offered to go down the shaft. The rescuers did not end up using him, though McClure was successfully recovered from the well.

Actor Gaten Matarazzo was born with cleidocranial dysplasia, which is incorporated into his character Dustin Henderson's storyline on Stranger Things.

Sibling actress-singers Milly and Abby Shapiro were born with cleidocranial dysplasia, a trait they share with their mother.

References

External links 
 

Congenital disorders of musculoskeletal system
Transcription factor deficiencies
Rare diseases
Wikipedia medicine articles ready to translate